Boulevard of Broken Dreams or The Boulevard of Broken Dreams may refer to:

Film and television
 Boulevard of Broken Dreams (film), a 1988 Australian film
 Boulevard of Broken Dreams (TV series), a 2007 American documentary series

Music
 "Boulevard of Broken Dreams" (Al Dubin song), a 1933 song by Al Dubin and Harry Warren
 The Boulevard of Broken Dreams Orchestra, a Dutch jazz band from the mid-1980s.
 Boulevard of Broken Dreams (album), a 1989 album by Smokie
 "Boulevard of Broken Dreams" (Smokie song), 1989
 "Boulevard of Broken Dreams" (Green Day song), 2004 
 "Boulevard of Broken Dreams", a 1984 song by Hanoi Rocks, from Two Steps from the Move
 "Boulevard of Broken Dreams", a 1986 song by Brian Setzer from the album The Knife Feels Like Justice
 "Boulevard of Broken Dreams", a 1990 song by David Cassidy from the album David Cassidy
 "Boulevard of Broken Dreams", a 1991 song by Beatmasters from the album Life & Soul

Literature
 The Boulevard of Broken Dreams (comics), by Kim Deitch 
 "The Boulevard of Broken Dreams", a story from Harlan Ellison's 1978 short story collection Strange Wine

Other
 Boulevard of Broken Dreams, a painting by Gottfried Helnwein  
 Boulevard of Broken Dreams, a game path in the 1996 PC game The Pandora Directive